Miloš Trifunović (born 15 October 1984) is a Serbian former footballer.

Club career
After playing in the youth squad of the giants Red Star Belgrade, he started his senior career at minor clubs Ribnica Mionica and FK Beograd.

In summer 2004 he moved to Montenegrin club Jedinstvo Bijelo Polje where he will play for two years, playing the second, 2005–06, in the First League of Serbia and Montenegro.

In spring of 2006, he had a short spell at Swedish Carlstad United BK, before signing with Serbian SuperLiga club FK Borac Čačak, in the next season. After six months there, he was loaned for the rest of the season to FK Javor who will end up signing him permanently, and where he would stay until December 2009, when he transferred to Red Star, the club where he started playing.

Since begin of 2011 he played on loan for FC Bunyodkor in the season 2011. He transferred to Chinese club Liaoning Whowin F.C. at January 2012. In February 2014 the Trifunovic moved to Kazakh FC Atyrau. After two years spent in Kazakhstan, in July 2015 he returned to Serbian SuperLiga in uniform Radnički Niš. In September 2015, he signed for Newcastle Jets as a foreign player.

On 8 April 2016, Trifunović returned to the Kazakhstan Premier League, signing for FC Ordabasy. 2 months later, 8 June 2016, Trifunović left Ordabasy by mutual consent.

One month later, Trifunović signed a two-year deal with Serbian side Vojvodina. After a short spell with Radnik Surdulica in early 2017, Trifunović moved to Mladost Lučani in summer same year. In July 2018 moved to AGMK. In January 2019, Trifunović moved to Rad Belgrade on a free transfer.

Career statistics

Club

Club
Javor Ivanjica
 Serbian First League: 2007–08
Red Star Belgrade
Serbian Cup (1): 2009–10
Bunyodkor
Uzbek League (1): 2011
Mladost Lučani
Serbian Cup runner up: 2017–18
FC AGMK
Uzbek Cup (1): 2018

Individual
Uzbek League Team of the Year (1): 2011
Uzbek League Top Scorer (1): 2011

References

External links
 

Living people
1984 births
Footballers from Belgrade
Serbian footballers
Serbian expatriate footballers
Association football forwards
FK Jedinstvo Bijelo Polje players
FK Borac Čačak players
FK Javor Ivanjica players
Red Star Belgrade footballers
FC Bunyodkor players
FK Radnički Niš players
FK Vojvodina players
FK Radnik Surdulica players
FK Mladost Lučani players
Liaoning F.C. players
Newcastle Jets FC players
FC Atyrau players
Chinese Super League players
Serbian SuperLiga players
A-League Men players
Kazakhstan Premier League players
Uzbekistan Super League players
Expatriate footballers in Sweden
Expatriate footballers in Jordan
Expatriate footballers in Uzbekistan
Expatriate footballers in China
Expatriate soccer players in Australia
Serbian expatriate sportspeople in Sweden
Serbian expatriate sportspeople in Uzbekistan
Serbian expatriate sportspeople in China
Serbian expatriate sportspeople in Australia
FC AGMK players